Robert Singerman (born 1942) is a librarian, and a recognized Judaica bibliographer. He is often cited by Judaica rare book dealers. He holds the position of University Librarian, George A. Smathers Libraries, University of Florida, where he was the bibliographer for Jewish Studies, Anthropology, and Linguistics.

For 27 years Singerman served as the University of Florida, Judaica librarian and bibliographer. He retired in June 2006. He first came to the university in 1979 having previously served at the world-renowned Klau Library of the Hebrew Union College-Jewish Institute of Religion in Cincinnati. In 1981, when the Price Library of Judaica was formally established at the university, Singerman commenced his tenure there, first as librarian, the only librarian to date. During the span of his long career at the university he was instrumental in increasing the size of the Judaica collection, from 24,000 volumes, to over 85,000 cataloged volumes. The Price Library prides itself as being without peer in the southeastern United States, as having “taken its place alongside other well-respected and mature Judaica collections in the United States.” For outstanding achievements, Singerman has been awarded the status of Faculty Emeritus following his retirement from the university.

Works
Library of Congress:
LC Control No.: 	 81043363
Type of Material: 	Book (Print, Microform, Electronic, etc.)
Personal Name: 	Singerman, Robert.
Main Title: 	Antisemitic propaganda: an annotated bibliography and research guide / Robert Singerman ; foreword by Colin Holmes.
Published/Created: 	New York : Garland, 1982.
Description: 	xxxvii, 448 p. ; 23 cm.

Notes: 	Includes bibliographical references and index.
Subjects: 	Antisemitism--United States--Bibliography.
	Antisemitism--Great Britain--Bibliography.
Series: 	Garland reference library of social science ; v. 112
LC Classification: 	Z6374.A56 S56 1982 DS141
Dewey Class No.: 	016.3058/924 19

The American Career of the "Protocols of the Elders of Zion"
American Jewish History
Vol. 71 (1981), pp. 48-78

The Library of Congress holds twelve titles under his name; he is the author of several bibliographic texts including the following:

 Jewish Serials of the World
 Judaica Americana
 Spanish and American Jewry

See also
Singerman list

External links
 http://web.uflib.ufl.edu/spec/news/singerman.htm
 Judaica Digital Collections, in the University of Florida Digital Collections

Bibliographers of Hebrew literature
Protocols of the Elders of Zion
1942 births
University of Florida faculty
Hebrew Union College – Jewish Institute of Religion faculty
Living people